In enzymology, a (R)-pantolactone dehydrogenase (flavin) is an enzyme that catalyzes the chemical reaction

(R)-pantolactone + acceptor  2-dehydropantolactone + reduced acceptor

Thus, the two substrates of this enzyme are (R)-pantolactone and acceptor, whereas its two products are 2-dehydropantolactone and reduced acceptor.

This enzyme belongs to the family of oxidoreductases, specifically those acting on the CH-OH group of donor with other acceptors.  The systematic name of this enzyme class is (R)-pantolactone:acceptor oxidoreductase (flavin-containing). Other names in common use include 2-dehydropantolactone reductase (flavin), 2-dehydropantoyl-lactone reductase (flavin), and (R)-pantoyllactone dehydrogenase (flavin).

References

 

EC 1.1.99
Enzymes of unknown structure